Zorro (Spanish for 'fox') is a fictional character created in 1919 by American pulp writer Johnston McCulley, appearing in works set in the Pueblo of Los Angeles in Alta California. He is typically portrayed as a dashing masked vigilante who defends the commoners and indigenous peoples of California against corrupt and tyrannical officials and other villains.

In the stories, Zorro has a high bounty on his head, but is too skilled and cunning for the bumbling authorities to catch, and he also delights in publicly humiliating them. Because of this, the townspeople started calling him "El Zorro" due to his foxlike cunning and charm. Zorro is an acrobat and an expert in various weapons, but the one he employs most frequently is his rapier, which he uses often to carve the initial "Z" on his defeated foes, and other objects to "sign his work". He is also an accomplished rider, his trusty steed being a black horse called Tornado.

Zorro is the secret identity of Don Diego de la Vega (originally Don Diego Vega), a young man who is the only son of Don Alejandro de la Vega, the richest landowner in California, while Diego's mother is dead. In most versions, Diego learned his swordsmanship while at university in Spain, and created his masked alter ego after he was unexpectedly summoned home by his father because California had fallen into the hands of an oppressive dictator. Diego is usually shown living with his father in a huge , which contains a number of secret passages and tunnels, leading to a secret cave that serves as headquarters for Zorro's operations and as Tornado's hiding place. In order to divert suspicion about his identity, Diego hides his fighting abilities while also pretending to be a coward and a fop.

Zorro made his debut in the 1919 novel The Curse of Capistrano, originally meant as a stand-alone story. However, the success of the 1920 film adaptation The Mark of Zorro starring Douglas Fairbanks and Noah Beery, which introduced the popular Zorro costume, convinced McCulley to write more Zorro stories for about four decades: the character was featured in a total of five serialized stories and 57 short stories, the last one appearing in print posthumously in 1959, the year after his death. The Curse of Capistrano eventually sold more than 50 million copies, becoming one of the best-selling books of all time. While the rest of McCulley's Zorro stories did not enjoy the same popularity, as most of them were never reprinted until the 21st century, the character also appears in over 40 films and in ten TV series, the most famous being the Disney-produced Zorro series of 1957–1959, starring Guy Williams. Other media featuring Zorro include stories by other authors, audio/radio dramas, comic books and strips, stage productions and video games.

Being one of the earliest examples of a fictional masked avenger with a double identity, Zorro inspired the creation of several similar characters in pulp magazines and other media, and is a precursor of the superheroes of American comic books, with Batman drawing particularly close parallels to the character.

Publishing history 

Zorro debuted in Johnston McCulley's novel The Curse of Capistrano, serialized in five parts between August 9 and September 6, 1919, in the pulp magazine All-Story Weekly. The story was originally meant as a standalone tale, and at the denouement, Zorro's true identity is revealed to all.

Douglas Fairbanks and Mary Pickford, on their honeymoon, selected the story as the inaugural picture for their new studio, United Artists, beginning the character's cinematic tradition. The novel was adapted as the film The Mark of Zorro (1920), which Fairbanks produced, co-wrote and starred in as Diego/Zorro. The movie was a commercial success, and the 1924 reprint of McCulley's story by publisher Grosset & Dunlap used the same title, capitalizing on the movie's popularity. The novel has since been reprinted using both titles.

In response to public demand fueled by the film, McCulley wrote more than sixty more Zorro stories, beginning in 1922 with The Further Adventures of Zorro, which was also serialized in Argosy All-Story Weekly. Fairbanks picked up the movie rights for the sequel that year. However, Fairbanks's sequel, Don Q, Son of Zorro (1925), was more based on the 1919 novel Don Q's Love Story by the mother–son duo Kate Prichard and Hesketh Hesketh-Prichard, than The Further Adventures. Thus McCulley received no credit on the film.

At first, production of new Zorro stories proceeded at irregular intervals: the third novel, Zorro Rides Again (not to be confused with the 1937 theatrical serial) was published in 1931, nine years after the second one. Then, between 1932 and 1941, McCulley wrote four short stories and two serialized novels. Zorro stories were published much more frequently between 1944 and 1951, a period in which McCulley published 52 short stories with the character for the West Magazine. "Zorro Rides the Trail!", which appeared in Max Brand's Western Magazine in 1954, is the last story to be published during the author's lifetime, and the second-to-last story overall. The last, "The Mask of Zorro" (not to be confused with the 1998 film), was published posthumously in Short Stories for Men in 1959. These stories ignore Zorro's public revelation of his identity.

The Curse of Capistrano eventually sold more than 50 million copies, becoming one of the best-selling books of all time. For the most part, McCulley's other Zorro stories remained overlooked and out-of-print until the 21st century. Bold Venture Press collected all McCulley's Zorro stories Zorro: The Complete Pulp Adventures, in six volumes.

Over 40 Zorro titled films were made over the years, including The Mark of Zorro, the 1940 classic starring Tyrone Power and Basil Rathbone. The character was also featured in ten TV series, the most famous being the Disney-produced Zorro series of 1957–59, starring Guy Williams. Zorro appears in several stories written by other authors, comics books and strips, stage productions, video games and other media. McCulley died in 1958, just as Zorro was at the height of his popularity thanks to the Disney series.

Fictional character biography

In The Curse of Capistrano, Señor Zorro became an outlaw in the pueblo of Los Angeles in California "to avenge the helpless, to punish cruel politicians, to aid the oppressed" and is dubbed the "Curse of Capistrano". The novel features extensively both Don Diego Vega and Zorro, but the fact that they are the same person is not revealed to the reader until the end of the book. In the story, both Diego and Zorro romance Lolita Pulido, an impoverished noblewoman. While Lolita is unimpressed with Diego, who pretends to be a passionless fop, she is attracted to the dashing Zorro. The main villain is Captain Ramon, who also has his eyes on Lolita. Other characters include Sgt. Pedro Gonzales, Zorro's enemy but Diego's friend; Diego's deaf and mute servant Bernardo; his ally, Fray (Friar) Felipe; his father Don Alejandro Vega, the richest landowner in California and a widower; Don Carlos Pulido and his wife, Doña Catalina, Lolita's parents; and a group of noblemen who, at first, hunt Zorro but are then won over to his cause.

In later stories, McCulley introduces characters such as pirates and Native Americans, some of whom know Zorro's identity.

In McCulley's later stories, Diego's surname became de la Vega. In fact, the writer was wildly inconsistent. The first magazine serial ended with the villain dead and Diego publicly exposed as Zorro. But in the sequel, the villain was alive and the next entry had the double identity still secret.

Several Zorro productions have expanded on the character's exploits. Many of the continuations feature a younger character taking up the mantle of Zorro.

McCulley's stories are set during the era of Spanish California (1769–1821) and, although exact years are often vague, the presence of the Pueblo of Los Angeles means the stories cannot happen before 1781, the year it was founded. Some media adaptations of Zorro's story have placed him during the later era of Mexican California (1821–1848).

Character motifs

The character's visual motif is typically a black costume with a black flowing Spanish cloak or cloak, a black flat-brimmed hat known as sombrero cordobés, and a black sackcloth mask that covers the top half of his head. Sometimes the mask is a two piece, the main item being a blindfold-type fabric with slits for the eyes, and the other item being a bandana over the head, so that it is covered even if the hat is removed: this is the mask worn in the movie The Mark of Zorro (1920) and in the television series Zorro (1957–1959). Other times, the mask is a one piece that unites both items described above: this mask was introduced in The Mark of Zorro (1940) and appears in many modern versions. Zorro's mask has also occasionally been shown as being a rounded domino mask, which he wore without also wearing a bandana. In his first appearance, Zorro's cloak is purple, his hat is generically referred to as a "wide sombrero," and his black cloth veil mask with slits for eyes covers his whole face. Other features of the costume may vary.

His favored weapon is a rapier, which he also uses to often leave his distinctive mark, a Z cut with three quick strokes, on his defeated foes and other objects to "sign his work". He also uses other weapons, including a bullwhip and a pistol.

The fox is never depicted as Zorro's emblem. It is used as a metaphor for the character's wiliness, such as in the lyrics "Zorro, 'the Fox', so cunning and free..." from Disney's television series theme.

His heroic pose consists of rearing on his horse, Tornado, often saluting with his hand or raising his sword high. The logo of the company Zorro Productions, Inc. uses an image of Zorro rearing on his horse, sword raised high.

Skills and resources

Zorro is very intelligent and can not only use a complex strategy, prepared before entering the battlefield, but also improvise plans in the moment of danger and combat. He never uses brute force and, indeed, more often than not he uses humor and psychological teasing to irritate his opponents, causing them to lose their emotional detachment and become too eager for revenge to be able to coordinate in action and in combat. He fools them by provoking them into his traps.

In addition to having exceptional tactical skills, he specializes in infiltrating heavily guarded enemy structures or territories, espionage and improvised explosive devices. His calculating and precise ability as a tactician allowed him to also use weapons as an extension of his skillful hand. He is also a weapons expert and a master of escape and camouflage. He is also good at deciphering numerous languages, both spoken and written. Zorro also masters body language, gestures and symbols, facilitating communication with locals regardless of ethnicity or language.

Zorro is an agile athlete and acrobat, using his bullwhip as a gymnastic accoutrement to swing through gaps between city roofs, and is very capable of landing from great heights and taking a fall. Although he is a master swordsman and marksman, he has more than once demonstrated his prowess in unarmed combat against multiple opponents. Keen intelligence and an acute power of observation are two main skills allowing Zorro to surprise, in order to defeat, establishment enemies.

His calculating and precise dexterity as a tactician has enabled Zorro to use two key weapons, his sword and bullwhip, as an extension of his deft hand. He never uses brute strength. Instead and more likely, he uses his fox-like and sly mind, and well-practiced technique to outmatch an opponent. He uses seduction as Zorro and coyness as Don Diego de la Vega, tricking his opponents to obstruct easy access to his true identity by using deception as masterful skill.

In some versions, Zorro keeps a medium-sized dagger tucked in his left boot for emergencies. He has used his cape as a blind, a trip-mat and a disarming tool. Zorro's boots are also sometimes weighted, as is his hat, which he has thrown, Frisbee-style, as an efficiently substantial warning to enemies. But more often than not, he uses psychological mockery to make his opponents too angry to be coordinated in combat.

Zorro is a skilled horseman. The name of his jet-black horse has varied through the years. In The Curse of Capistrano, it was unnamed. In Disney's Zorro television series the horse gets the name Tornado, which has been kept in many later adaptations. In most versions, Zorro keeps Tornado in a secret cave, connected to his  with a system of secret passages and tunnels.

McCulley's concept of a band of men helping Zorro is often absent from other versions of the character. An exception is Zorro's Fighting Legion (1939), starring Reed Hadley as Diego. In Douglas Fairbanks' version, he also has a band of masked men helping him. In McCulley's stories, Zorro was aided by a deaf-mute named Bernardo. In Disney's Zorro television series, Bernardo is not deaf but pretends to be, and serves as Zorro's secret agent. He is a capable and invaluable helper for Zorro, sometimes wearing the mask to reinforce his master's charade. The Family Channel's Zorro television series replaces Bernardo with a teenager named Felipe, played by Juan Diego Botto, with a similar disability and pretense. In Isabel Allende's Zorro: A Novel, Bernardo is the child of the de la Vega's Native housemaid, Ana, who forms a bond with Regina de la Vega, a former Native warrior who is converted, Christainized and married to Don Alejandro. Their dual pregnancies result in them giving birth the same night. Due to complications from birth, Regina cannot breastfeed her child, Diego, so Ana breastfeeds both boys, making them milk brothers. The two are shown to be inseparable, which helps Bernardo receive more formal education, and accompanies Diego to Barcelona. After a group of pirates invade the de la Vega home, Bernardo witnesses the rape and murder of his mother and a result stops speaking. Diego's grandmother White Owl concludes Bernardo refuses to speak as a form of mourning. He is shown to speak to Tornado in a spirit quest and later to a fellow native girl, Light-in-the-Night, whom he marries.

Characteristics

In The Curse of Capistrano, Diego is described as "a fair youth of excellent blood and twenty-four years, noted the length of El Camino Real for his small interest in the really important things of life." It is also said that "Don Diego was unlike the other full-blooded youths of the times. It appeared that he disliked action. He seldom wore his blade, except as a matter of style and apparel. He was damnably polite to all women and paid court to none. ... Those who knew Don Diego best declared he yawned ten score times a day." Though proud as befitting his class (and seemingly uncaring about the lower classes), he shuns action, rarely wearing his sword except for fashion, and is indifferent to romance with women. This is, of course, a sham. At the end of the novel, Diego explains that he has planned his double identity since he was fifteen:

"It began ten years ago, when I was but a lad of fifteen," he said. "I heard tales of persecution. I saw soldiers beat an old native who was my friend. And then I determined to play this game."

"It would be a difficult game to play, I knew. So I pretended to have small interest in life, so that men never would connect my name with that of the highwayman I expected to become. In secret, I practiced horsemanship and learned how to handle a blade—"

"By the saints, he did," Sergeant Gonzales growled.

"One half of me was the languid Don Diego you all knew, and the other half was the Curse of Capistrano I hoped one day to be. And then the time came, and my work began."

"It is a peculiar thing to explain, . The moment I donned cloak and mask, the Don Diego part of me fell away. My body straightened, new blood seemed to course through my veins, my voice grew strong and firm, fire came to me! And the moment I removed cloak and mask I was the languid Don Diego again. Is it not a peculiar thing?"

This part of the backstory was changed in the 1920 film The Mark of Zorro: Diego is recently returned from Spain at the start of the movie, and Zorro later tells Lolita that he learnt his swordsmanship in Spain. The 1925 sequel Don Q, Son of Zorro expands on this concept by saying that: "Though the home of the De Vegas has long been on California soil, the eldest son of each new generation returns to Spain for a period of travel and study." The 1940 film The Mark of Zorro keeps the idea of Diego learning his swordsmanship in Spain, and adds the idea of him being unexpectedly summoned home by his father Don Alejandro when California fell into the hand of an oppressing dictator. Both ideas would then be included in most retelling of the character's backstory.

McCulley's portrayal of Diego's personality, with minor variations, is followed in most Zorro media.

A notable exception to this portrayal is Disney's Zorro (1957–59), where Diego, despite using the original façade early in the series, instead becomes a passionate and compassionate crusader for justice and simply masquerades as "the most inept swordsman in all of California". In this show, everyone knows Diego would love to do what Zorro does, but thinks he does not have the skill.

The Family Channel's Zorro (1990–1993) takes this concept further. While Diego pretends to be inept with a sword, the rest of his facade is actually exaggerating his real interests. Diego is actually well-versed and interested in art, poetry, literature, and science. His facade is pretending to be interested in only these things and to have no interest in swordplay or action. Zorro also has a well-equipped laboratory in his hidden cave in this version of the story.

In Isabel Allende's novel, Diego is a mestizo, the son of a Spanish aristocrat and a Shoshone warrior woman. Thus, as a child, Diego is caught between the divine right of nobility and the ways of his Native mother, grandmother and ancestors.

Inspirations
The historical figure most often associated with the Zorro character is Joaquin Murrieta, whose life was fictionalized in an 1854 dime novel by John Rollin Ridge. In the 1998 film The Mask of Zorro Murrieta's (fictitious) brother Alejandro succeeds Diego as Zorro. As a hero with a secret identity who taunts his foes by signing his deeds, Zorro finds a direct literary predecessor in Sir Percival Blakeney, hero of the Scarlet Pimpernel pulp series by Emma Orczy.

The character recalls other figures, such as Robin Hood, Reynard the Fox, Salomon Pico, Manuel Rodríguez Erdoíza, and Tiburcio Vasquez. Another possible historical inspiration is William Lamport, an Irish soldier who lived in Mexico in the seventeenth century. His life was the subject of a fictive book by Vicente Riva Palacio; The Irish Zorro (2004) is a recent biography. Another is Estanislao, a Yokuts man who led a revolt against the Mission San Jose in 1827.

The 1860s, 1880s and 1900s penny dreadful treatment of the Spring-heeled Jack character as a masked avenger may have inspired some aspects of Zorro's heroic persona. Spring Heeled Jack was portrayed as a nobleman who created a flamboyant, masked alter ego to fight injustice, frequently demonstrated exceptional athletic and combative skills, maintained a hidden lair and was known to carve the letter "S" into walls with his rapier as a calling card.

Like Sir Percy in The Scarlet Pimpernel, Don Diego avoids suspicion by playing the role of an effete dandy who wears lace, writes poetry, and shuns violence. The all-black Fairbanks film costume, which with variations has remained the standard costume for the character, was likely adapted from the Arrow serial film character The Masked Rider (1919). This character was the first Mexican black-clad masked rider on a black horse to appear on the silver screen. Fairbanks's costume in The Mark of Zorro, released the following year, resembled that of the Rider with only slight differences in the mask and hat.

In 1860 Mór Jókai published his novel "Szegény Gazdagok" (Poor richmen), where the main character is the Hungarian Baron Lénárd Hátszegi, who is supposed to have the alterego of the "Fatia Negra" (The one with the Black face), an outlaw who robs local people during the night, and during the day lives an aristocratic life. The novel's character was inspired by the real life Hungarian Baron László Nopcsa (1794–1884), who according to the local legends had a similar type of alterego.

Copyright and trademark disputes
The copyright and trademark status of the Zorro character and stories have been disputed. Most of the entries of the Zorro franchise are still protected by copyright, and many hundreds of copyrights are owned or controlled by Zorro Productions, Inc. but there are at least five exceptions: the 1919 novel The Curse of Capistrano, the 1920 film The Mark of Zorro, the 1922 novel The Further Adventures of Zorro, the 1925 film Don Q, Son of Zorro and the 1926 film In the Way of Zorro are in the public domain in the United States since at least 95 years have passed after their first release. Zorro Productions, Inc. asserts that it "controls the worldwide trademarks and copyrights in the name, visual likeness and the character of Zorro." It further states "[t]he unauthorized, unlicensed use of the name, character and/or likeness of 'Zorro' is an infringement and a violation of state and federal laws."

In 1999, TriStar Pictures, a division of Sony Pictures, sued Del Taco, Inc., due to a fast-food restaurant advertising campaign that allegedly infringed Zorro Productions' claims to a trademark on the character of Zorro. Sony and TriStar had paid licensing fees to Zorro Productions, Inc., related to the 1998 film The Mask of Zorro. In an August 1999 order, the court ruled that it would not invalidate Zorro Productions' trademarks as a result of the defendant's arguments that certain copyrights in Zorro being in the public domain or owned by third parties.

A dispute took place in the 2001 case of Sony Pictures Entertainment v. Fireworks Ent. Group. On January 24, 2001, Sony Pictures, TriStar Pictures and Zorro Productions, Inc. sued Fireworks Entertainment, Paramount Pictures, and Mercury Entertainment, claiming that the Queen of Swords television series infringed upon the copyrights and trademarks of Zorro and associated characters. Queen of Swords is a 2000–2001 television series set in Spanish California during the early 19th century and featuring a hero who wore a black costume with a red sash and demonstrated similarities to the character of Zorro, including the sword-fighting skills, use of a whip and bolas, and horse-riding skills.

Zorro Productions, Inc., argued that it owned the copyright to the original character because Johnston McCulley assigned his Zorro rights to Mitchell Gertz in 1949. Gertz died in 1961, and his estate transferred to his children, who created Zorro Productions, Inc. Fireworks Entertainment argued that the original rights had already been transferred to Douglas Fairbanks, Sr. in 1920 and provided documents showing this was legally affirmed in 1929, and also questioned whether the copyright was still valid.

The court ruled that "since the copyrights in The Curse of Capistrano and The Mark of Zorro lapsed in 1995 or before, the character Zorro has been in the public domain". Judge Collins also stated that: "Plaintiffs' argument that they have a trademark in Zorro because they licensed others to use Zorro, however, is specious. It assumes that ZPI had the right to demand licenses to use Zorro at all." Judge Collins subsequently vacated her ruling following an unopposed motion filed by Sony Pictures, TriStar Pictures and Zorro Productions, Inc.

In another legal action in 2010, Zorro Productions, Inc., sued Mars, Incorporated, makers of M&M's chocolate candies, and ad agency BBDO Worldwide over a commercial featuring a Zorro-like costume. The case was settled ("each party shall bear its own costs incurred in connection with this action, including its attorney's fees and costs") on August 13, 2010.

In March 2013, Robert W. Cabell, author of Z – the Musical of Zorro (1998), filed another lawsuit against Zorro Productions, Inc. The lawsuit asserted that the Zorro character is in the public domain and that the trademark registrations by Zorro Productions, Inc., are therefore fraudulent. In October 2014, Cabell's lawsuit was dismissed, with the judge ruling that the state of Washington (where the case was filed) did not have jurisdiction over the matter. However the judge later reversed his decision and had the case transferred to California. In May 2017, U.S. District Judge Davila granted Zorro Productions, Inc.'s motion to dismiss Cabell's claim to cancel its federal trademark registrations. Cabell did not appeal.

In June 2015, Robert W. Cabell's legal dispute with Zorro Productions, Inc. resulted in the Community Trade Mark for "Zorro" being declared invalid by the European Union's Office for Harmonization in the Internal Market for goods of classes 16 and 41. This follows the 'Winnetou' ruling of the Office's First Board of Appeal in which the Board of Appeal ruled that the name of famous characters cannot be protected as a trademark in these classes. Zorro Productions appealed the decision and, on December 19, 2017, the EUIPO Fourth Board of Appeal nullified the lower court's ruling, declaring the contested trademarks as valid, and required Cabell to pay the costs of the legal action, the appeal and Zorro Productions' legal fees and costs. Zorro Productions, Inc. owns approximately 1300 other ZORRO related trademarks worldwide. In May 2018, Judge Edward Davila processed a complaint by Cabell to find Zorro Productions infringed copyright on his musical.

Legacy

The 1936 film The Vigilantes Are Coming features a masked vigilante with a costume similar to Zorro, which led several countries to name the movie after Zorro: the film was named Zorro l'indomptable in France, Zorro – Der blutrote Adler in Germany, Zorro – den blodrøde ørn in Denmark and Zorro – veripunainen kotka in Finland. The main character, The Eagle, is played by Robert Livingston, who would then play the actual Zorro in the movie The Bold Caballero, also released in 1936.The Vigilantes Are Coming "was a reworking of The Eagle, Rudolph Valentino's silent film." In the film, Valentino plays the masked hero Black Eagle. The Eagle  was based on the posthumously published 1841 novel Dubrovsky by Alexander Pushkin, the Black Eagle does not exist in the novel and was inspired by the performance of Douglas Fairbanks as Zorro in The Mark of Zorro. 

The Masked Rider, the primary mascot of Texas Tech University, is similar to Zorro. Originally called "Ghost Rider", it was an unofficial mascot appearing in a few games in 1936 and then became the official mascot with the 1954 Gator Bowl.

Being one of the earliest examples of a fictional avenger with a double identity, Zorro inspired the creation of several similar characters in pulp magazines and other media, and is a precursor of the superheroes of American comic books, Jerry Siegel has credited Zorro along with The Scarlet Pimpernel as one of the inspirations for the creation of Superman particularly the concept of his dual identity as mild mannered reporter Clark Kent, as Clark Kent's harmless facade and dual identity were inspired by the protagonists of such movies as Don Diego de la Vega in The Mark of Zorro and Sir Percy Blakeney in The Scarlet Pimpernel, Siegel thought this would make for interesting dramatic contrast and good humor. Superman's stance as the Champion of the Oppressed and devil-may-care attitude during his early Golden Age appearances were influenced by the characters of The Mark of Zorro star Douglas Fairbanks, who starred in similar adventure films such as Robin Hood.

Also being one of the earliest examples of a fictional masked avenger with a dual identity, Bob Kane has credited Zorro as part of the inspiration for the character Batman, which was created in 1939. Like Don Diego de la Vega, Bruce Wayne is affluent, the heir of wealth built by his parents. His everyday persona encourages others to think of him as shallow, foolish and uncaring to throw off suspicion. Frank Miller's comic book miniseries The Dark Knight Returns (1986) and The Dark Knight Strikes Again (2001–2002) both include multiple Zorro references like the Batman inscribing a Z on a defeated foe. In later tellings of Batman's origins, Bruce Wayne's parents are murdered by a robber as the family leaves a showing of the 1940 film The Mark of Zorro, starring Tyrone Power.

Zorro inspired a similar pulp character known as El Coyote, which was created in 1943 by José Mallorquí. A sample superhero character called The Fox appearing in the Supers supplement of the GURPS role-playing system is also based on Zorro.

The Republic Pictures serials Don Daredevil Rides Again  (1951) and Man with the Steel Whip (1954) features masked heroes similar to Zorro: Don Daredevil and El Latigo. Republic had previously released five Zorro serials between 1937 and 1949, but had since lost the licence for the character and could not use him anymore. The serial makes frequent use of stock footage from all five Zorro serials, with scenes originally showing Zorro now being interpreted as showing Don Daredevil and El Latigo: the result of this is that the costume and body shape of Don Daredevil and El Latigo keeps changing between scenes, even becoming female in scenes taken from Zorro's Black Whip (1944).

The 1956 musical comedy The Court Jester features a masked freedom fighter called The Black Fox (played by Edward Ashley) who combines aspects of both Zorro and Robin Hood.

Hanna-Barbera Productions' animated series Pixie and Dixie and Mr. Jinks (1958–1961) featured a Zorro-like character with a mask, cape and sword known in the episode "Mark of the Mouse" (1959). Hanna-Barbera Production's animated series The Quick Draw McGraw Show (1959–1962) features El Kabong, an alternate persona of the main character Quick Draw McGraw, which is loosely based upon Zorro.

In the animated series Justice League (2001–2004), a DC Comics character, El Diablo, bears a striking similarity to Zorro, in that he wears the same style hat, mask, sash and cape. The main difference is that his primary weapon is a whip. The Lazarus Lane version of El Diablo appears in Justice League Unlimited (2004–2006), voiced by Nestor Carbonell. While designed after his comic appearance, elements from Zorro's appearance were added in. Seen in the episode "The Once and Future Thing" (2005), he appears alongside Pow Wow Smith, Bat Lash and Jonah Hex.

In 2015, The M7 Con Western Convention, held at the Los Angeles Convention Center featured a segment on the history of Zorro in film and television. The presentation focused on the great Zorro actors including Douglas Fairbanks, Tyrone Power, Guy Williams, and Duncan Regehr. Maestro Ramon Martinez and actor Alex Kruz gave a live demonstration of the Spanish style of fencing known as La Verdadera Destreza. The two dueled live as Zorro and the Comandante much to the delight of the crowd.

A cave that was used as a filming location in various Zorro productions is now known as "Zorro's Cave" and remains in place, now hidden behind a condominium complex, on land that was once the Iverson Movie Ranch in Chatsworth, Calif., recognized as the most widely filmed outdoor shooting location in the history of Hollywood.

The DreamWorks character Puss in Boots, an anthropomorphic cat sporting high boots, a broad-brimmed and feathered sombrero, and a rapier, was also heavily inspired by Zorro (though ultimately based on the earlier Italian fairytale character of the same name). Portrayed by Antonio Banderas who also earlier played Zorro, he premiered as a character in Shrek 2 (2004) and in later sequels, as well as inspiring his own spinoff films Puss in Boots (2011) and Puss in Boots: The Last Wish (2022).

Appearances in media

Stories by Johnston McCulley

The original stories were published in pulp magazines from the 1910s to the 1950s. Most remained unpublished in book form until the series of collected editions Zorro: The Complete Pulp Adventures, issued in 2016 and 2017.
 Zorro: The Complete Pulp Adventures Vol. 1 (2016)
 The Curse of Capistrano, All-Story Weekly Vol. 100 No. 2 – Vol. 101 No. 2, serialized in five parts, August 9, 1919 – September 6, 1919 – novella The Curse of Capistrano published by Grosset & Dunlap in 1919, and reissued as The Mark of Zorro in 1924 by the same editor
 "Zorro Saves A Friend", Argosy Vol. 234 No. 1, November 12, 1932
 "Zorro Hunts A Jackal", Argosy Vol. 237 No. 6, April 22, 1933 (a.k.a. Zorro Hunts by Night)
 Zorro: The Complete Pulp Adventures Vol. 2 (2016)
 The Further Adventures of Zorro, Argosy Vol. 142 No. 4 – Vol. 143 No. 3, serialized in six parts, May 6, 1922 – June 10, 1922
 "Zorro Deals With Treason", Argosy Vol. 249 No. 2, August 18, 1934
 "Mysterious Don Miguel", Argosy Weekly, Vol. 258 No. 5 – No. 6, serialized in two parts, September 21, 1935 – September 28, 1935
 Zorro: The Complete Pulp Adventures Vol. 3 (2016)
 Zorro Rides Again, Argosy Vol. 224 No. 3 – Vol. 224 No. 6, serialized in four parts, October 3, 1931 – October 24, 1931
 "Zorro Draws a Blade", West Magazine Vol. 56 No. 2, July 1944
 "Zorro Upsets a Plot", West Magazine Vol. 56 No. 3, September 1944
 "Zorro Strikes Again", West Magazine Vol. 57 No. 1, November 1944
 "Zorro Saves a Herd", West Magazine Vol. 57 No. 2, January 1945
 "Zorro Runs the Gauntlet", West Magazine Vol. 57 No. 3, March 1945
 "Zorro Fights a Duel", West Magazine Vol. 58 No. 1, May 1945
 "Zorro Opens a Cage", West Magazine Vol. 58 No. 2, July 1945
 "Zorro Prevents a War", West Magazine Vol. 58 No. 3, September 1945
 "Zorro Fights a Friend", West Magazine Vol. 59 No. 1, October 1945
 "Zorro's Hour of Peril", West Magazine Vol. 59 No. 2, November 1945
 "Zorro Lays a Ghost", West Magazine Vol. 59 No. 3, December 1945
 Zorro: The Complete Pulp Adventures Vol. 4 (2016)
 The Sign of Zorro, Argosy Vol. 305 No. 2 – Vol. 305 No. 6, serialized in five parts, January 25, 1941 – February 22, 1941
 "Zorro Frees Some Slaves", West Magazine Vol. 60 No. 1, January 1946
 "Zorro's Double Danger", West Magazine Vol. 60 No. 2, February 1946
 "Zorro's Masquerade", West Magazine Vol. 60 No. 3, March 1946
 "Zorro Stops a Panic", West Magazine Vol. 61 No. 1, April 1946
 "Zorro's Twin Perils", West Magazine Vol. 61 No. 2, May 1946
 "Zorro Plucks a Pigeon", West Magazine Vol. 61 No. 3, June 1946
 "Zorro Rides at Dawn" West Magazine Vol. 62 No. 1, July 1946
 "Zorro Takes the Bait", West Magazine Vol. 62 No. 2, August 1946
 "Zorro Raids a Caravan", West Magazine Vol. 62 No. 3, October 1946
 "Zorro's Moment of Fear", West Magazine Vol. 63 No. 3, January 1947
 Zorro: The Complete Pulp Adventures Vol. 5 (2017)
 "A Task for Zorro", West Magazine Vol. 65 No. 2, June 1947
 "Zorro Saves His Honor", West Magazine Vol. 64 No. 1, February 1947
 "Zorro and the Pirate", West Magazine Vol. 64 No. 2, March 1947
 "Zorro Beats the Drum", West Magazine Vol. 64 No. 3, April 1947
 "Zorro's Strange Duel", West Magazine Vol. 65 No. 1, May 1947
 "Zorro's Masked Menace", West Magazine Vol. 65 No. 3, July 1947
 "Zorro Aids an Invalid", West Magazine Vol. 66 No. 1, August 1947
 "Zorro Saves an American", West Magazine Vol. 66 No. 2, September 1947
 "Zorro Meets a Rogue", West Magazine Vol. 66 No. 3, October 1947
 "Zorro Races with Death", West Magazine Vol. 67 No. 1, November 1947
 "Zorro Fights for Peace", West Magazine Vol. 67 No. 2, December 1947
 "Zorro Serenades a Siren", West Magazine Vol. 68 No. 1, February 1948
 "Zorro Meets a Wizard", West Magazine Vol. 68 No. 2, March 1948
 "Zorro Fights with Fire", West Magazine Vol. 68 No. 3, April 1948
 "Gold for a Tyrant", West Magazine Vol. 69 No. 1, May 1948
 "The Hide Hunter", West Magazine Vol. 69 No. 2, July 1948
 Zorro: The Complete Pulp Adventures Vol. 6 (2017)
 "Zorro's Fight for Life", West Magazine, Vol. 74 No. 2, July 1951
 "Zorro Shears Some Wolves", West Magazine Vol. 69 No. 3, September 1948
 "The Face Behind the Mask", West Magazine Vol. 70 No. 1, November 1948
 "Zorro Starts the New Year", West Magazine Vol. 67 No. 3, January 1948
 "Hangnoose Reward", West Magazine Vol. 70 No. 3, March 1949
 "Zorro's Hostile Friends", West Magazine Vol. 71 No. 1, May 1949
 "Zorro's Hot Tortillas", West Magazine Vol. 71 No. 2, July 1949
 "An Ambush for Zorro", West Magazine Vol. 71 No. 3, September 1949
 "Zorro Gives Evidence", West Magazine Vol. 72 No. 1, November 1949
 "Rancho Marauders", West Magazine Vol. 72 No. 2, January 1950
 "Zorro's Stolen Steed" West Magazine Vol. 73 No. 3, March 1950
 "Zorro Curbs a Riot", West Magazine Vol. 73 No. 3, September 1950
 "The Three Stage Peons", West Magazine Vol. 74 No. 1, November 1950
 "Zorro Nabs a Cutthroat", West Magazine Vol. 74 No. 2, January 1951
 "Zorro Gathers Taxes", West Magazine Vol. 74 No. 3, March 1951
 "Zorro Rides the Trail!", Max Brand's Western Magazine, May 1954
 "The Mask of Zorro", Short Stories for Men Vol. 221 No. 2, April 1959

Stories by other authors
 Walt Disney's Zorro by Steve Frazee 1958 Whitman Publishing Company, novelization of some episodes of the 1957 Zorro TV series
 "Zorro Outwits Death", Walt Disney's Magazine Vol. III No. 3, April 1958. Loosely based on the episode "Zorro's Secret Passage" of the 1957 Zorro TV series
 "Zorro's Merry Chase", Walt Disney's Magazine, Vol. III No. 5, August 1958
 "The Fire of the Night", Walt Disney's Magazine, Vol. III No. 6, October 1958 and Vol. IV No. 1, 1958
 "Zorro and the Missing Father", Walt Disney's Magazine, Vol. IV No. 3, April 1959 and No. 4, June 1959. Adapted from the episodes "The Missing Father", "Please Believe Me", and "The Brooch" of the 1957 Zorro TV series
 Zorro by Olivier Séchan 1959 Hachette
 Il Ritorno di Zorro by B.F. Deakin 1968 Arnoldo Mondadori Editore, anthology of nine short stories
 Zorro arrive ! by Jacques Van Hauten 1971 Hachette, novelization of some episodes of the 1957 Zorro TV series
 Le Retour de Zorro by Jean-Claude Deret 1972 Hachette, novelization of some episodes of the 1957 Zorro TV series
 Zorro et le sergent Garcia by Thérèse Bertels 1973 Hachette, novelization of some episodes of the 1957 Zorro TV series
 Zorro et le trésor du Pérou by Thérèse Bertels 1973 Hachette
 Zorro contre le gouverneur by Jean-Claude Deret 1974 Hachette, novelization of some episodes of the 1957 Zorro TV series
 L'Épée de Zorro by Jean-Claude Deret 1975 Hachette
 Zorro et l'épee du cid 1991 Hachette 
 Zorro et la forteresse du diable by Valentin Dechemin 1991 Hachette , novelization of some episodes of the 1990 Zorro TV series
 Zorro and the Jaguar Warriors by Jerome Preisler September 1998 Tom Doherty Associates, Inc. Books 
 The Mask of Zorro: A Novelization by James Luceno 1998 Pocket Books , novelization of the 1998 movie The Mask of Zorro
 The Treasure of Don Diego by William McCay 1998 Minstrel Books , based on the film The Mask of Zorro
 Zorro and The Dragon Riders by David Bergantino March 1999 Tom Doherty Associates, Inc. Books 
 Skull and Crossbones by Frank Lauria 1999 Minstrel Books , based on the film The Mask of Zorro
 The Secret Swordsman by William McCay 1999 Minstrel Books , based on the film The Mask of Zorro
 The Lost Temple by Frank Lauria 1999 Minstrel Books, based on the film The Mask of Zorro
 Lo Spirito e la Spada by Louis A. Tartaglia 1999
 Zorro! by Sally M. Stockton 1999 Cideb, based on the novella The Curse of Capistrano
 El Zorro by Margarita Barberá Quiles  1999 Cideb, based on the novella The Curse of Capistrano
 Zorro and the Witch's Curse by John Whitman April 2000 Tom Doherty Associates, Inc. Books 
 La vera storia di Zorro by Isabella Parrini 2000 Alberti & C. 
 Zorro: l'ultima avventura ovvero la storia di Zorro, Volume 2 by Isabella Parrini 2001 Alberti & C.
 The Legend of Zorro: A Novelization by Scott Ciencin 2005 HarperCollins , novelization of the 2005 movie The Legend of Zorro
 The Lone Ranger/Zorro: The Death Of Zorro By Ande Parks 2012 Simon Bowlands Crossover between The Lone Ranger and Zorro
 Zorro by Isabel Allende 2005 HarperCollins 
 Young Zorro: The Iron Brand by Jan Adkins 2005 HarperCollins 
  Zorro l'angelo nero della California by Irene Sartini 2007 Alberti & C 
  Zorro l'angelo nero della California – L'avventura continua by Irene Sartini 2008 Alberti & C 
 Tales of Zorro anthology of 17 short stories written by 22 authors, edited by Richard Dean Starr 2008 Moonstone Books 
 Zorro and the Little Devil by Peter David 2018 Bold Venture Press 
 Zorro: The Daring Escapades anthology of 16 short stories, edited by Audrey Parente and Daryl McCullough 2020 Bold Venture Press .

Films
The character has been adapted for over forty films. They include:

American theatrical feature films
 The Mark of Zorro (1920), with Douglas Fairbanks, directed by Fred Niblo
 Don Q, Son of Zorro (1925), with Douglas Fairbanks, directed by Donald Crisp
 The Bold Caballero (1936), with Robert Livingston, directed by Wells Root
 The Mark of Zorro (1940), with Tyrone Power, directed by Rouben Mamoulian
 The Sign of Zorro (1958), with Guy Williams, portions of the first 13 Zorro TV episodes edited into a feature film, released overseas in 1958 and domestically in 1960
 Zorro, the Avenger (1959), with Guy Williams, another theatrical compilation of several Zorro TV episodes, released overseas.
 The Erotic Adventures of Zorro (1972), an erotic parody of the masked avenger, co-produced in Italy and Germany, Douglas Frey
 The Mark of Zorro (1974), a made for television movie which is a remake of the 1940 film, with Frank Langella as Zorro, directed by Don McDougall
 Zorro, The Gay Blade (1981), a parody directed by Peter Medak with George Hamilton as Diego Jr. and his twin brother Ramon. Diego Jr. succeeds his late father as Zorro, but he soon breaks his leg and Ramon fills in while Diego Jr. recuperates.
 The Mask of Zorro (1998), directed by Martin Campbell with Anthony Hopkins as an aged Don Diego de la Vega and Antonio Banderas as Alejandro Murrieta, a misfit outlaw/cowboy who is groomed to become the next Zorro, with Alejandro eventually marrying Diego's daughter Elena (Catherine Zeta-Jones)
 The Legend of Zorro (2005), the sequel to 1998's The Mask of Zorro, again starring Antonio Banderas and Catherine Zeta-Jones, and directed by Martin Campbell

American film serials
 Zorro Rides Again (1937), with John Carroll as a modern-day descendant, James Vega
 Zorro's Fighting Legion (1939), with Reed Hadley as the original Zorro/Don Diego de la Vega
 Son of Zorro (1947), with George Turner as a Civil War descendant, Jeff Stewart
 Ghost of Zorro (1949), with Clayton Moore as Ken Mason, Zorro's grandson/"The Ghost of Zorro"

Despite the title and a credit to McCulley, Zorro's Black Whip (1944), with Linda Stirling as an 1880s masked avenger known as The Black Whip, has nothing to do with Zorro.

Mexican films
 El Nieto del Zorro (1948) Mexican Western with Resortes
 El Zorro Escarlata (1959), Mexican Western with Luis Aguilar
 El zorro escarlata en diligencia fantasma (1959), Mexican Western with Luis Aguilar
 El Zorro Vengador (1962), Mexican Western with Luis Aguilar,
 El Zorro (1962), Mexican Western with Julio Aldama,
 La Gran Aventura Del Zorro (1976), Mexican Western with Rodolfo de Anda, set in a very primitive San Francisco Bay Area.

European films
 À la manière de Zorro / In the Way of Zorro (1926) Belgium William Elie – Unofficial
 Il sogno di Zorro / The Dream of Zorro / Zorro's Dream (1952) Italy Walter Chiari
 La montaña sin ley / Lawless Mountain (1953) Spain José Suárez
 Zorro alla corte di Spagna / Zorro at the Spanish Court (1962) Italy George Ardisson
 La venganza del Zorro (1962) Spain Frank Latimore
 Le tre spade di Zorro / The Three Swords of Zorro (1963) Spain & Italy Guy Stockwell
 Zorro e i tre moschettieri / Zorro and the Three Musketeers (1963) Italy Gordon Scott
 Zorro contro Maciste / Samson and the Slave Queen (1963) Italy & Spain Pierre Brice
  / Duel at the Rio Grande / Sign of Zorro (1963) Spain, Italy & France Sean Flynn
 El Zorro cabalga otra vez / Il Giuramento di Zorro  / Behind the Mask of Zorro (1965) Italy & Spain Tony Russel
 Zorro il ribelle / Zorro the Rebel (1966) Italy Howard Ross
 El Zorro / Zorro the Fox (1968) Italy & Spain George Ardisson
 I nipoti di Zorro / The Nephews of Zorro (1968) Italy, comedy with Franco and Ciccio as Franco La Vacca and Ciccio La Vacca, nephews of Don Diego de la Vega's late wife. Dean Reed plays Raphael de la Vega, son of Don Diego and the new Zorro, while Franco Fantasia plays an aged Don Diego, who has retired from being Zorro.
 Zorro marchese di Navarra / Zorro, the Navarra Marquis (1969) Italy Nadir Moretti
 Zorro alla corte d'Inghilterra / Zorro in the Court of England (1969) Italy Spiros Focás
 E continuavano a chiamarlo figlio di ...  / El Zorro justiciero / The Avenger, Zorro (1969) Italy & Spain Fabio Testi
 La última aventura del Zorro / Zorro il dominatore / Zorro's Latest Adventure (1969) Spain & Italy Carlos Quiney
 Zorro il cavaliere della vendetta / El Zorro, caballero de la justicia / Zorro, Rider of Vengeance (1971) Spain & Italy Carlos Quiney
 El Zorro de Monterrey / Zorro la maschera della vendetta / Zorro the Invincible (1971) Spain & Italy Carlos Quiney
 Les aventures galantes de Zorro / Red Hot Zorro (1972) France & Belgium Jean-Michel Dhermay
 Il figlio di Zorro / Son of Zorro / Man with the Golden Winchester (1973) Italy & Spain Alberto Dell'Acqua
 Il sogno di Zorro / Grandsons of Zorro / Dream of Zorro (1975) Italy Franco Franchi
 Zorro (1975) Italy & France Alain Delon
 La marque de Zorro / The Mark of Zorro (1975) France; additional sequences added to La venganza del Zorro (1962) with Frank Latimore renamed Clint Douglas
 Ah sì? E io lo dico a Zzzzorro! / Mark of Zorro / Who's Afraid of Zorro / They Call Him Zorro ... Is He? (1975) Italy & Spain George Hilton – Unofficial

Turkey:
 Zorro kamcili süvari (1969) Turkey Tamer Yiğit
 Zorro'nun intikami (1969) Turkey Tamer Yiğit

India:
 Zorro (1975) India Navin Nischol

Note: Unofficial means not included in official film list at zorro.com

Argentina

Zorro, el sentimiento de hierro  (2019), fan film

Television series
American series – live-action
 Zorro, a Disney half-hour television series, running from 1957 to 1959, starring Guy Williams as Zorro for 78 episodes. The two features listed above starring Guy Williams were episode compilations, and there were four one-hour follow-ups on the Walt Disney anthology television series in the 1960–1961 TV season.
 Zorro and Son, broadcast in 1983 for 5 episodes, was a situation comedy in which an aged Don Diego (Henry Darrow) trains his son Carlos (Paul Regina) to succeed him as Zorro.
 Zorro, also called The New Zorro, New World Zorro, or Zorro 1990, was a television series which starred Duncan Regehr as Zorro for 88 episodes on The Family Channel from 1990 to 1993. Two feature-length videos were episode compilations. An unaired alternate pilot episode was included in the 2011 DVD release of the series: the pilot features a different cast and story, with Don Diego dying and Don Antonio de la Cruz (Patrick James) taking up the mantle of Zorro.
 In the series finale of Once Upon a Time, "Leaving Storybrooke" (aired May 18, 2018), Zorro is said to be able to shapeshift into a dragon, and in that form, fathered Maleficent (Kristin Bauer van Straten)'s daughter, Lily (Nicole Muñoz (teen)/Agnes Bruckner (adult)).  Zorro himself does not appear in the series, possibly as a result of cancellation.  Lily appears in the fourth season (2014-2015) episodes, "Breaking Glass," "Lily," "Mother," and "Operation Mongoose: Part 2."
 In November 2019 it was announced that a new series was in development by NBC with Alfredo Barrios Jr. as both writer and executive producer, with by Propagate and CBS Television Studios as producers. The series will have more of a "modern day" setting and will follow Z, a female descendant from the Zorro bloodline, as she fulfills her duty to "protect the defenseless in her community". In December 2020, Robert Rodriguez and Sofía Vergara were announced as executive producers. In January 2022, the series was moved from NBC to The CW and later ordered six scripts.
 In December 2021, it was announced that a new series was in development by Disney-ABC. Wilmer Valderrama will executive produce and star as Diego de la Vega in what is described as a "reimagining" of the series. Ayo Davis, president of Disney Branded Television stated that the series is "set in Pueblo de Los Angeles, but told in a very modern telenovela style". Valderrama confirmed that the series will be on Disney+. On March 6, 2023, Bryan Cogman was announced as series showrunner.
 In May 2022, Amazon Prime announced that Secuoya Studios is developing a modern-day Zorro series. The ten-episode series will be directed by Javier Quintas and Miguel Ángel Vivas with Miguel Bernardeau cast in the lead, along with Renata Notni.

American series – animation
 The New Adventures of Zorro, 1981 animated series from Filmation, which consists of 13 episodes.
 The New Adventures of Zorro, 1997–1998 animated series from Fred Wolf Films, which consists of 26 episodes.
 The Amazing Zorro, 2002 made for TV animated film created by DIC Entertainment as part of their DIC Movie Toons lineup. It premiered on Nickelodeon and was later released on DVD and VHS shortly afterward by MGM Home Entertainment.
 Zorro: Generation Z, 2006 animated series from BKN International which consists of 26 episodes. It follows a descendant of the original Zorro, also named Diego De La Vega, fighting crime and the corrupt government of Pueblo Grande in a future setting.

International series

 Kaiketsu Zorro, (1996–1997) Japanese anime version from NHK and Ashi Productions, which consists of 52 episodes.
 Zorro: La Espada y la Rosa (The Sword and the Rose), a 2007 Spanish language telenovela from Sony Pictures and Telemundo, starring Christian Meier as Don Diego de la Vega/Zorro. It consists of 112 episodes.
 Zorro, a 2009 TV series from the GMA Network of the Philippines, starring Richard Gutierrez. It consists of 98 episodes.
 Zorro: The Chronicles, a French animated series (2015), voiced by Johnny Yong Bosch
 On October 14, 2022, it was announced that a French television series based on the character was in development for France Télévisions, starring Jean Dujardin as Don Diego / Zorro.

Audio/radio dramas
 Walt Disney's Zorro: [1. Presenting Señor Zorro; 2. Zorro Frees The Indians; 3. Zorro And The Ghost; 4. Zorro's Daring Rescue] (1957) released by Disneyland Records. This album retold stories from the Disney Zorro television series and featured Guy Williams as Zorro and Don Diego, Henry Calvin as Sergeant Garcia, Phil Ross as Monastario, Jan Arvan as Torres, Jimmie Dodd from The Mickey Mouse Club as Padre Felipe, with other voices by Dallas McKennon and sound effects by Jimmy MacDonald and Eddie Forrest. Record story adaptations by Bob Thomas and George Sherman. Music composed and conducted by William Lava.
 The Adventures of Zorro. (1957) Based on the original Johnston McCulley story The Curse of Capistrano (aka The Mark of Zorro). It was written by Maria Little, directed by Robert M. Light and produced by Mitchell Gertz. This short-lived radio show was a series of short episodes. Only a handful of episodes are known to have survived.
 The Mark of Zorro. (1997) [No longer available] Produced by the BBC it starred Mark Arden as Zorro, Louise Lombard as Lolita and Glyn Houston as Friar Felipe. It aired in 5 parts. 1. July 3, 97 Night of the Fox: 2. July 10, 97 Deadly Reckonings: 3. July 17, 97 The Avenging Blade 4. July 24, 97 The Place of Skulls 5. July 31, 97 The Gathering Storm
 Zorro and the Pirate Raiders. (2009) Based on the D.J. Arneson adaptation of Johnston McCulley's The Further Adventures of Zorro. Produced by Colonial Radio Theatre on the Air. Published by Brilliance Audio. It features Kevin Cirone, Shonna McEachern, Hugh Metzler, J.T. Turner, Sam Donato, Joseph Zamperelli Jr., and Dan Powell.
 Zorro Rides Again. (2011) Based on the D.J. Arneson adaptation of Johnston McCulley's "Zorro Rides Again". Produced by Colonial Theatre on the Air. It features the voice talents of Kevin Cirone, Jeremy Benson, Shonna McEachern, Shana Dirk, Sam Donato, and Hugh Metzler.
 The Mark of Zorro. (2011) Based on The Curse of Capistrano. Produced by Hollywood Theater of the Ear for Blackstone Audio. It features the voice talents of Val Kilmer as Diego de la Vega/Zorro, Ruth Livier as Lolita Pulido, Elizabeth Peña as Doña Catalina Pulido, Armin Shimerman as the Landlord, Mishach Taylor as Sgt Pedro Gonzalez, Keith Szarabajka as Cpt Ramone, Ned Schmidtke as Don Carlos Pulido, Scott Brick as the Governor, Stefan Rudnicki as Fray Felipe, Kristoffer Tabori as Don Alejando de la Vega, Philip Proctor as Don Audre, John Sloan as the Magistrado, and Gordo Panza in numerous roles.

Toys
Due to the popularity of the Disney TV series, in 1958, The Topps Company produced an 88-card set featuring stills from that year's movie. The cards were rare and became collectors' items. In the same year the Louis Marx company released a variety of Zorro toys such as hats, swords, toy pistols and a playset with the Lido company also making plastic figures.

A major toy line based on the classic Zorro characters, motifs and styling, was released by Italian toy giant, Giochi Preziosi, master toy licensees of the property. The toy range was developed by Pangea Corporation and released worldwide in 2005 and featured action figures in various scales, interactive playsets and roleplaying items. New original characters were also introduced, including Senor Muerte, who served as a foil to Zorro.

In 2007, Brazilian toymaker Gulliver Toys licensed the rights to Zorro: Generation Z, which was co-developed by BKN and Pangea Corporation. The toy range was designed concurrent and in association with the animated program.

In 2011, US-based collectibles company Triad Toys released a 12-inch Zorro action figure.

Comics

Zorro has appeared in many different comic book series over the decades. In Hit Comics #55, published by Quality Comics in November 1948, Zorro is summoned by Kid Eternity, but in this version has only a whip and does not wear a mask.

Dell Comics published Zorro in Four Color Comics #228 (1949), 425 (1952), 497 (1953), 538 (1954), 574 (1954), 617 (1955) and 732 (1957). These stories featured artwork by Everett Raymond Kinstler (#497, 538, and 574), Bob Fujitani, Bob Correa and Alberto Giolitti.

Dell also had a licence to publish Disney comics in the United States and, following the launch of Disney's Zorro TV series in 1957, published seven more issues of Four Color dedicated to Zorro between February 1958 and September 1959, under said licence, with the first stories featuring artwork by Alex Toth. In December 1959, Dell started the publication of a standalone Disney-licensed Zorro title, which started the numeration at #8 and continued to be published until issue #15 (September 1961). The character then appeared in four stories published in the monthly Walt Disney's Comics and Stories (also published by Dell), one story per issue from #275 (August 1963) to #278 (November 1963): these were the last Zorro stories produced in the United States under the Disney licence. However, Disney produced more stories from 1964 to 1978 through the Disney Studio Program, a unit producing comic book stories exclusively for foreign consumption. In addition to publishing translations of American stories and Disney Studio stories, many foreign publishers also produced their own original stories under the Disney licence: these countries are the Netherlands (1964–1967), Chile (1965–1974), Italy (1969–1971), Brazil (1973–1983), France (1974–1986) and Germany (1980–1982).

Gold Key Comics started another Disney-licensed Zorro series in January 1966, but, like their contemporaneous Lone Ranger series, it featured only material reprinted from the earlier Dell comics, and folded after 9 issues, in March 1968. The character remained dormant in the United States for the next twenty years until it was revived by Marvel Comics in 1990, for a 12-issue tie-in with the Duncan Regehr television series Zorro. Many of these comics had Alex Toth covers.

In 1993 Topps Comics published a 2-issue limited series Dracula Versus Zorro followed by a Zorro series that ran 11 issues. Topps also published two limited series of Lady Rawhide, a spin-off from the Zorro stories created by writer Don McGregor and artist Mike Mayhew. McGregor subsequently scripted a limited series adaptation of The Mask of Zorro film for Image Comics.

A newspaper daily and Sunday strip were also published in the late 1990s. This was written by McGregor and rendered by Tom Yeates. Papercutz once published a Zorro series and graphic novels as well. This version is drawn in a manga style.

Dynamite Entertainment relaunched the character with a 20-issue Zorro series which ran from 2008 to 2010, written by Matt Wagner and drawn by multiple artists. The publisher also released an earlier unpublished tale called "Matanzas" by Don McGregor and artist Mike Mayhew. Zorro (here a 1930s descendant) also appears in the 2013 Dynamite eight-issue limited series Masks alongside the Green Hornet and Kato, The Shadow, and The Spider. It was written by Chris Roberson with art by Alex Ross and Dennis Calero.

Dynamite Entertainment also published a seven-issue series titled Django/Zorro between November 2014 and May 2015, teaming Zorro with the character Django Freeman from Quentin Tarantino's movie Django Unchained (2012). The series was co-written by Tarantino and Matt Wagner, with art by Esteve Polls.

In 2018, American Mythology took the license, launched the series Zorro Legendary Adventures, written by Jean-Marie Nadaud and drawn by Robert Rigot and limited series Zorro: Swords of Hell, written by David Avallone and illustrated by Roy Allan Martinez. The company has since released crossovers featuring Zorro with their other licensed properties, namely Zorro in the Land that Time Forgot featuring Diego De La Vega accompanying an expedition to the lost world of Caspak from the Edgar Rice Burroughs novels.

Collected editions 
Over the years, various English reprint volumes have been published. These include, but are not limited to:
 Zorro in Old California, Eclipse Books 
 Zorro The Complete Classic Adventures By Alex Toth. Volume One, Image Comics 1998. 
 Zorro The Complete Classic Adventures By Alex Toth. Volume Two, Image Comics 1998. 
 Zorro The Dailies – The First Year By Don McGregor, Thomas Yeates. Image Comics 2001. 
 Alex Toth's Zorro: The Complete Dell Comics Adventures. Hermes Press 2013. 
 Zorro: The Complete Dell Pre-Code Comics. Hermes Press 2014.

Stage productions
Approximately 65 separate Zorro live productions have been produced. These have included traditional stage plays, comedies, melodramas, musicals, children's plays, stunt shows, and ballets. Some examples include:
 Ken Hill wrote and directed the musical production of Zorro, which opened on February 14, 1995, at the East Stratford Theater in London. Ken Hill died just days before the opening.
 Alvaro Cervino produced a musical comedy, "Zorro El Musical" in Mexico City, Mexico in July 1996. Critics called it "a show that captivates audiences both by its performances and above all, by its magnificent musical numbers".
 Michael Nelson wrote a stage adaptation of Zorro for the Birmingham Children's Theater in 1996. Beaufort County Now called it "a fun and fast paced production perfect for children 6 and up." Abe Reybold directed with scenic design by Yoshi Tanokura and costume designs by Donna Meester. Jay Tumminello provided an original score.
 Theater Under the Stars in Houston, Texas, put on Zorro, the Musical as an opera in 1998. It was written and directed by Frank Young and starred Richard White as Zorro.
 Z – The Masked Musical by Robert W. Cabell was released in 1998 as a CD. The CD premiere with Ruben Gomez (Zorro) and Debbie Gibson (Carlotta) is published as a CD. In 2000, the stage play premiered at the South Eugene High School in Eugene, Oregon, where it had four performances by the amateur group, ACE. It was then produced on June 13, 2013, at the Clingenburg Festspiele in Klingenberg am Main, Bavaria, Germany, with Karl Grunewald and Philip Georgopoulos as alternating Zorros, Judith Perez as Carlotta, Daniel Coninx as Governor Juan Carlos, Daniel Pabst as Capitàn Raphaél Ramerez and Christian Theodoridis as Sergeant Santiago Garcia. This production was directed by Marcel Krohn and premiered in the presence of the composer.
 In 1999, Anthony Rhine and Joseph Henson wrote Zorro Live!, which was performed at the Riverside Light Opera theater.
 In 2000, Fernando Lúpiz produced his first original "Zorro" show. It was such a crowd pleaser that he mounted a new production thereafter almost annually until 2014. His productions were performed most frequently in arenas, featuring live horses, rousing swordplay and songs.
 In 2001, the Gaslight Theatre of Tucson, Arizona, reprised its 1994 spoof called "Zerro Rides Again" or "No Arrest for the Wicked". It was described as "full of silly wigs, ridiculous situations, songs that barely fit in, and dialogue so fat with wordplay that it's tough not to love it. 'Zerro' is a chance to laugh yourself silly. Seize it".
 In 2002, playwright Michael Harris wrote The Legend of Zorro, which has been performed in many high schools.
 In 2002, Luis Alvarez produced his El Zorro El Spectaculo in the Teatro Calderon in Madrid, Spain. Critics lauded it saying "Manuel Bandera makes the ideal Zorro. We hope he has the stamina necessary to endure the long run this play deserves."
 Michael Smuin's critically lauded modern ballet version of Zorro premiered in the Yerba Buena Center for the Arts in San Francisco in 2003. Composer Charles Fox provided the score, and Matthew Robbins wrote the libretto. Ann Beck was costume designer and Douglas W. Schmidt was set designer. Smuin himself choreographed.
 Culture Clash's Zorro in Hell opened in 2005 in the Berkeley Repertory theater, then in 2006 in the La Jolla Playhouse and the Montelban Theater in Los Angeles. Zorro In Hell was written and performed by Richard Montoya, Ric Salinas and Herbert Siguenza. Culture Clash used the legend of Zorro as a lens to examine California's cultural, economic and historical issues. The LA Times called it "a zany bicultural send-up of California history."
 Award-winning playwright Bernardo Solano wrote a modern adaptation of Zorro for TheatreWorks at the University of Colorado in 2007. Robert Castro directed and Justin Huen starred as Zorro. The Denver post called the production "a fresh take," and "a formula other companies should emulate."
 In Uppsala, Sweden, Erik Norberg wrote a Zorro stage adaptation for the Stadsteatern Theatre directed by Alexander Oberg and starring Danilo Bejarano as Zorro. The production opened in 2008.
 A musical titled Zorro opened in the West End of London in 2008. It was written by Helen Edmundson and Stephen Clark, with music by the Gipsy Kings and John Cameron, and directed by Christopher Renshaw. It was nominated for 5 Oliviers, including Best Musical. It has since enjoyed professional productions in Tokyo, Paris, Amsterdam, Moscow, Prague, Warsaw, Tel Aviv, Seoul, Shanghai, São Paulo and elsewhere. The US premiere production took place in 2012 at Hale Centre Theatre in Salt Lake City, Utah, with a further production at the Alliance Theater in Atlanta Georgia, where it won five awards including Best Musical.
 The Scottish children's theater troupe Visible Fictions put on a touring production of The Mask of Zorro in 2009. Davey Anderson wrote the script and Douglas Irvine directed. Robin Peoples designed the sets, which The New York Times called "a triumph."
 Lifehouse Theater, a Redlands, CA-based company, put on 'Zorro, written and scored by Wayne Scott. Zorro opened in 2009.
 In 2012, Janet Allard and Eleanor Holdridge produced and directed Zorro at the Constellation Theatre in Washington, DC. Holdridge directed and Danny Gavigan played Zorro. The Washington Post said of the production, "Constellation augments its classical thrust in a thoughtful way with 'Zorro,' which continues the company's laudable efforts at delivering intimate theater with high standards for design."
 In 2012, Medina Produzioni, based in Rome, Italy, produced its musical, "W Zorro il Musical – liberamente ispirato alla storia di William Lamport" in numerous theatres throughout Italy.
 The Oregon-based ballet troupe Ballet Fantastique produced Zorro: The Ballet as an opener to their 2013 season. Eugene Weekly called the ballet "zesty, fresh, fantastic treat."
 Elenco Produções produced its musical, "Zorro", in Porto, Portugal in 2013.

Music
On the commercial release of the Zorro 1957 Disney TV series' Zorro theme, the lead vocal was by Henry Calvin, the actor who played Sergeant Garcia on the program. The song was written by Jimmie Dodd.

The Chordettes sang the single version of the song, complete with the "Sounds of the Z" and the clip clopping of Zorro's horse, which is heard at the song's end. The song hit Number 17 in 1958 according to the Billboard Charts.

In 1964, Henri Salvador sang "Zorro est arrivé." It tells from a child's point of view how exciting it is whenever a villain threatens to kill a lady in the television series. But every time again, to his relief, the "great and beautiful" Zorro comes to the rescue. An early music video was made at the time.

Alice Cooper's 1982 album Zipper Catches Skin includes the song "Zorro's Ascent" which is about Zorro facing his death.

The 1999 song "El Corona" by Suburban Legends tells the story of "Don Diego", the "hombre en negro" ("man in black"), a "tall Spaniard with a sharp sword" who was "down and out in LA" and defending the people from an unnamed corrupt ruler.

Video games
 Zorro (1985), Apple II, Atari 8-bit family, Commodore 64, Amstrad CPC
 Zorro (1986), ZX Spectrum
 Zorro (1995), PC
 The Mask of Zorro (1999), Game Boy Color
 The Shadow of Zorro (2001), PC, PlayStation 2
 The Destiny of Zorro (2008), Wii
 Zorro: Quest for Justice (2009), Nintendo DS
 There is a Zorro themed poker machine at gaming establishments in Australia and New Zealand.
 Zorro is Morgana's Persona in Persona 5 (2017), PlayStation 3, PlayStation 4
 Zorro appears as a paid DLC Guest Fighter in Go All Out!, PC,
 Zorro: The Chronicles (2022), PC, Xbox, Wii, PlayStation

Role-playing games
 In July 2001, the Gold Rush Games published The Legacy of Zorro Introductory Adventure Game by Mark Arsenault for Fuzion.
 In January 2019, Gallant Knight Games used crowdfunding platform Kickstarter to finance the game  Zorro: The Roleplaying Game '' for the D6 System.

See also
 Gentleman thief

References

Bibliography

External links

 Zorro Productions, Inc.
 A guide to the Walt Disney television series version of Zorro
 A comprehensive guide to the New World Zorro television series
 The Legacy of the Fox: A Chronology of Zorro
 
 Don Diego de la Vega at the INDUCKS

 
Characters in pulp fiction
Dynamite Entertainment characters
Fictional acrobats
Fictional Alta California people
Fictional Mexican people
Fictional characters from Los Angeles
Fictional fencers
Fictional bandits
Fictional gentleman thieves
Fictional human rights activists
Fictional nobility
Fictional outlaws
Fictional prison escapees
Fictional slaves
Fictional socialites
Fictional swordfighters
Fictional vigilantes
Fictional whip users
Film serial characters
Latin American superheroes
Literary characters introduced in 1919
Male characters in comics
Male characters in film
Male characters in literature
Mass media franchises
Pre-statehood history of California
Series of books
Topps Comics characters
Western (genre) heroes and heroines
Western (genre) outlaws